Senyo Kogyo is a Japanese entertainment company specializing in the production and operation of amusement park equipment. The company is known for manufacturing Ferris wheels.

Ferris wheel

References

External links
 

Companies based in Osaka
Entertainment companies established in 1958
1958 establishments in Japan
Amusement ride manufacturers
Roller coaster manufacturers